Calcatodrillia is a genus of sea snails, marine gastropod mollusks in the family Pseudomelatomidae,.

Species
Species within the genus Calcatodrillia include:
 Calcatodrillia chamaeleon Kilburn, 1988
 Calcatodrillia hololeukos Kilburn, 1988

References

 R.N. Kilburn (1988), Turridae (Mollusca: Gastropoda) of southern Africa and Mozambique. Part 4. Subfamilies Drilliinae, Crassispirinae and Strictispirinae; Ann. Natal Mus. Vol. 29(1) Pages 167-320

External links
 
 Bouchet, P.; Kantor, Y. I.; Sysoev, A.; Puillandre, N. (2011). A new operational classification of the Conoidea (Gastropoda). Journal of Molluscan Studies. 77(3): 273-308

 
Pseudomelatomidae
Gastropod genera